Oceanimonas smirnovii is a Gram-negative, aerobic, melanogenic and chemoorganotrophic bacterium from the genus of Oceanimonas which has been isolated from the Black Sea.

References

External links
Type strain of Oceanimonas smirnovii at BacDive -  the Bacterial Diversity Metadatabase

Aeromonadales
Bacteria described in 2005